María Fernanda Álvarez Terán and María Irigoyen were the defending champions, having won the event in 2013, however Álvarez Terán chose not to participate. Irigoyen partnered Irina Falconi as the second seeds, but lost in the semifinals to Kateryna Bondarenko and Valeria Savinykh.

The top seeds Petra Martić and Maria Sanchez won the title, defeating Bondarenko and Savinykh in the final, 3–6, 6–3, [10–2].

Seeds

Draw

References 
 Draw

Abierto Tampico - Doubles